The Chaux Ronde (2,028 m) is a mountain in the western Bernese Alps, overlooking Villars-sur-Ollon in the canton of Vaud. The mountain is part of a ski area and its summit is easily accessible from Bretaye with the Bex–Villars–Bretaye railway.

A ski-lift leads to a secondary summit (1,987 m).

References

External links
Chaux Ronde on Hikr

Mountains of the Alps
Mountains of the canton of Vaud
Mountains of Switzerland